Havana Declaration or Declaration of Havana may refer to:
 Havana Declaration of 1940, at the Havana Conference that year
 First Declaration of Havana, signed in 1960
 Second Declaration of Havana, signed in 1962
 Havana Declaration of 1966, at the Tricontinental Conference 1966
 Havana Declaration of 1979, issued at the 1979 Conference of the Non-Aligned Movement
 Havana Declaration (2016), also known as the Joint Declaration of Pope Francis and Patriarch Kirill